The 1994 Pan American Men's Handball Championship was the sixth edition of the tournament, held in Santa Maria, Brazil from 17 to 23 September 1993. It acted as the American qualifying tournament for the 1995 World Championship, where the top three placed team qualied.

Standings

Results
All times are local (UTC−3).

External links
Results on todor66.com

Pan American Men's Handball Championship
Pan American Men's Championship
Pan American Men's Handball Championship
International handball competitions hosted by Brazil
Pan American Men's Handball Championship